

Surname 
Atılay Canel (born 1955), Turkish football coach
Buck Canel (1906–1980), American Spanish language Major League Baseball broadcaster
Eva Canel (1857–1932), Spanish journalist and writer
Miguel Díaz-Canel (born 1960), Cuban politician

Given name 
Canel Konvur (1939–2018), Turkish high jumper

See also 
Canel's